James Deeley (1871 – after 1895) was an English professional footballer who played in the Football League for Small Heath. Born in Evesham, Worcestershire, Deeley played for Worcester Rovers before joining Small Heath in August 1895. An outside left, Deeley played only once for Small Heath, in the First Division on 6 April 1896, deputising for Tommy Hands in a game at West Bromwich Albion which finished goalless, before he returned to non-league football with Hereford Thistle. He died in Worcester.

References

1871 births
Year of death missing
People from Evesham
English footballers
Association football wingers
Worcester City F.C. players
Birmingham City F.C. players
Hereford Thistle F.C. players
English Football League players
Date of birth missing
Sportspeople from Worcestershire